The 2015 National Premier Leagues was the third season of the Australian National Premier Leagues football competition. The league competition was played amongst eight separate divisions, divided by FFA state and territory member federations. The divisions are ACT, NSW, Northern NSW, Queensland, South Australia, Tasmania, Victoria and Western Australia.

The winners of each respective divisional league competed in a finals playoff tournament at season end, with Blacktown City crowned as National Premier Leagues Champions, which gave them direct qualification for the 2016 FFA Cup Round of 32.

League tables

ACT

Finals

NSW

Finals

Northern NSW

Finals

Queensland

Finals

South Australia

Finals

Tasmania

Finals

Victoria

Finals

Western Australia

Final Series
The winner of each league competition (top of the table) in the NPL competed in a single match knockout tournament to decide the National Premier Leagues Champion for 2015. For the quarter-final stage the participants were matched up based on geographical proximity.  The winner also qualified for the 2016 FFA Cup Round of 32.

Quarter-finals

Semi-finals
Home field advantage was based on a formula relating to the quarter final results - time of winning (normal time, extra time or penalties), goals scored and allowed, and yellow/red cards.

Grand Final
Home field advantage was based on a formula relating to the combined quarter-final and semi final results - time of winning (normal time, extra time or penalties), goals scored and allowed, and yellow/red cards.

Individual honours
Joey Gibbs from Blacktown City won the John Kosmina Medal for the best player in the NPL Grand Final.

References

External links
 Official website

2015
2015 domestic association football leagues
2015 in Australian soccer